Conasauga, Tennessee may refer to the following places in Tennessee:

Conasauga, McMinn County, Tennessee, an unincorporated community
Conasauga, Polk County, Tennessee, an unincorporated community